The tennis competitions at the 2013 Mediterranean Games in Mersin took place between 24 June and 29 June at the Mersin Tennis Complex with capacity for 3000.

Athletes competed in 4 events.

Medal summary

Medalists

Medal table
Key:

References

 
Sports at the 2013 Mediterranean Games
2013
2013 in tennis